Yamanokami-ike Dam is an earthfill dam located in Ehime Prefecture in Japan. The dam is used for irrigation and water supply. The catchment area of the dam is  km2. The dam impounds about 2  ha of land when full and can store 123 thousand cubic meters of water. The construction of the dam was started on 1958 and completed in 1963.

References

Dams in Ehime Prefecture
1963 establishments in Japan